Mivali or Meyvoli may refer to:
 Mivali-ye Darab Khan
 Mivali-ye Sofla
 Mivali Shirkhan